Chushina Ridge is a ridge in Alberta, Canada and is nearby to Lynx Mountain and Extinguisher Tower. The nearest accommodations to Chushina Ridge are Robson Pass Campground and Berg Lake Campground in Fraser-Fort George H.

Chushina is a word derived from the Stoney language meaning "small".

References

Ridges of Alberta